Bollo is a bun made from corn, yuca or potato.

Bollo may also refer to:

 Bollo, a character from The Mighty Boosh television series
Boli, Ivory Coast, a town in Ivory Coast, also known as Bollo
 Marca da bollo, an Italian revenue stamp

See also
Bolo (disambiguation)